Carlos Eduardo da Silva Rodrigues Lima (born 6 April 2001) is a Brazilian professional footballer who plays as a defender for the club Internacional.

Professional career
On 16 September 2019, Carlos Eduardo signed his first professional contract with. Carlos Eduardo made his professional debut with Internacional in a 2-0 Campeonato Gaúcho win over Novo Hamburgo on 8 February 2020.

References

External links
 
 Internacional Profile

2001 births
Living people
Footballers from São Paulo (state)
Brazilian footballers
Association football defenders
Sport Club Internacional players
Campeonato Brasileiro Série A players
People from Taboão da Serra